Pygoctenucha clitus is a moth in the subfamily Arctiinae. It was described by Herbert Druce in 1884. It is found in Costa Rica.

References

Moths described in 1884
Phaegopterina